"You Give Me Something" is the debut single of English singer James Morrison, released on 17 July 2006. The song is featured on his 2006 debut album, Undiscovered. The single reached number one in New Zealand and charted within the top 10 in several nations, including Australia, the Netherlands, Switzerland, and the United Kingdom. The song was nominated for a BRIT Award in the category Best British Single Shortlist in 2007. This song was ranked number 100 on MTV Asia's list of the "Top 100 Hits of 2007".

Meaning
When James Morrison was in New Zealand and appeared on New Zealand Idol, the two finalists asked Morrison what the meaning behind the song was, and Morrison said that it was intended to be a "harsh love song". The lyrics mean that the protagonist of the song does not love the person as much as she loves him, but is willing to give the relationship a try.

Music video
The music video takes place in a studio where Morrison is seated in a chair, surrounded by microphones while singing and playing guitar. His backing orchestra plays behind curtains that show only their shadows. Watching him are a woman with a lollipop, a group of girls skipping rope and a group of showgirls.

A second version of the video was released in early 2007. It features Morrison performing the song for pedestrians in New York City's Chinatown. It was filmed on the corner of Lafayette Street and Canal Street. A New York University bus is briefly visible in the background.

Track listing
 "You Give Me Something"
 "Is There Anybody Home?"
 "Burns Like Summer Sun"

Charts and certifications

Weekly charts

Year-end charts

Certifications

Release history

References

2006 songs
2006 debut singles
James Morrison (singer) songs
Music videos directed by Philip Andelman
Number-one singles in New Zealand
Polydor Records singles
Songs written by Eg White
Songs written by James Morrison (singer)